Tears of the Turtle Cave is located in the Bob Marshall Wilderness in western Montana and is currently the deepest known limestone cave in the United States since passing New Mexico's Lechuguilla cave in 2014. The cave consists mostly of narrow fissure passage passing over approximately 50 short rope drops. With a mean temperature of  it is muddy and poorly decorated.

Exploration History 
The entrance to Tears of the Turtle Cave was found in 2006. The cave passage is mostly a two to three foot wide fissure that follows a stream downward through over 40 rappels. Initial single-day expeditions of the cave reached a depth of 400 feet. In 2014, a team of nine cavers underwent the first multi-day expedition and explored a new passage pushing the cave to a depth of 1629 feet, surpassing New Mexico's Lechuguilla Cave to become the deepest known limestone cave in the United States. Exploration continued in 2016 when teams descended to a depth of 1659 feet.

The depth of the cave, along with the technical rope work required to reach that depth,  temperature, and remote location of the cave make continued exploration difficult. Ongoing exploration is done through the Caves of Montana Project, an official project of the National Speleological Society. Exploration is conducted under a MOU with the United States Forest Service.

Geology 
The cave is located in typical karst landscape and is formed in the Cambrian Pagoda Limestone. Over the years water from rainfall and snowmelt have dissolved away the limestone to form a typical vadose solutional cave with fissure passage 2–3 feet wide and tall ceilings.

See also 
 Lechuguilla Cave

References

External links 
* Northern Rocky Mountain Grotto

Caves of Montana
Limestone caves
Wild caves